General William Schaw Cathcart, 1st Earl Cathcart  (17 September 175516 June 1843) was a British soldier and diplomat.

Early life
He was the son of Charles Cathcart, 9th Lord Cathcart and his wife Ann Hamilton.

Cathcart born at Petersham, London, on 17 September 1755, and educated at Eton College.

Military career
In 1771 he went to St. Petersburg, where his father, Charles Cathcart, 9th Lord Cathcart, a general in the army, was ambassador. He became an excellent horseman in Russia then from 1773 to 1777 he studied law at the University of Glasgow and was afterwards called to the Scottish Bar. He succeeded to the lordship upon his father's death in 1776, and inherited several properties including Schawpark an estate near Sauchie where his father had commissioned Robert Adam to remodel the mansion house but the works were incomplete when his father died.

In 1777 he obtained a commission in the 7th Dragoons.
Proceeding to America in 1777, he had before the close of his first campaign twice won promotion on the field of battle. He transferred to the 17th Light Dragoons. In 1778 he further distinguished himself in outpost work, and at the Battle of Monmouth he commanded an irregular corps, the British Legion, with conspicuous success; for a time also he acted as quartermaster-general to the forces in America. He returned home in 1780, and in February 1781 was made captain and lieutenant colonel in the Coldstream Guards.

In September 1784 Cathcart organised the first formal cricket match in Scotland, in the grounds of Schawpark and commissioned a family portrait by David Allan to commemorate the event.

He was elected a representative peer for Scotland in 1788, and in 1792 he became colonel of the 29th Foot. He served with distinction in the campaigns in the Low Countries, 1793–1795, in the course of which he was promoted major general; and in 1801 he was made a lieutenant general, having in the meanwhile received the appointments of Vice Admiral of Scotland (1795), privy councillor (1798), and colonel of the 2nd Life Guards (1797).

From 1803 to 1805 Lord Cathcart was Commander-in-Chief in Ireland, and in the latter year he was sent by Pitt to supersede Sir George Don in command of the 14,000 strong British Hanover Expedition. He occupied Hanover on 14 December and joined with Werdereffsky's Russian column of Tolstoi's corps.

After the recall of this expedition Cathcart commanded the forces in Scotland until 1807, when he was placed in charge of the expedition to Copenhagen, which surrendered to him on 6 September. Four weeks later he was created Viscount Cathcart of Cathcart and Baron Greenock of Greenock in the peerage of the United Kingdom, resuming the Scottish command on his return from the front.

On 1 January 1812 he was promoted to the full rank of general, and a few months later he proceeded to Russia as ambassador and military commissioner. In the latter capacity he served with the headquarters of the allies throughout the War of Liberation (1812–1814); his success in the delicate and difficult task of maintaining harmony and devotion to the common cause amongst the generals of many nationalities was recognized after the war by his elevation to an earldom (July 1814). He then went to St. Petersburg, and continued to hold the post of ambassador until 1820, when he returned to the United Kingdom.

He died at his estate near Glasgow on 16 June 1843. He is buried in Paisley Abbey with a monument by William Mossman erected in 1848.

Family
Cathcart married Elizabeth Elliot, the daughter of the lieutenant-governor of New York Andrew Elliot, on 10 April 1779. The couple had ten children, the first five being born in the 1780s. Their first child, Louisa, was born in New York on 25 January 1780, but died soon after her birth. Other children included the army officers Sir George Cathcart and Sir Charles Cathcart, both of whom became generals, the latter inheriting the peerage on his father's death.

William's first-born son, William Cathcart, entered the Royal Navy but died of yellow fever in 1804 while in command of his ship HMS Clorinde.

Cathcart took two of his sons with him during his appointment as ambassador to Russia, Captain Frederick Macadam Cathcart served as his private secretary and Lieutenant George Cathcart functioned as his aide-de-camp. Cathcart's last son, Adolphus Frederick Cathcart, was born on 28 June 1803.

See also
List of ships named Lord Cathcart

References

Books cited

External links

|-

|-

|-
 

|-

1755 births
1843 deaths
7th Queen's Own Hussars officers
17th Lancers officers
Ambassadors of the United Kingdom to Russia
British Army generals
British Army personnel of the American Revolutionary War
British Army personnel of the French Revolutionary Wars
British Army commanders of the Napoleonic Wars
British Life Guards officers
Coldstream Guards officers
Commanders-in-Chief, Ireland
Diplomatic peers
Earls in the Peerage of the United Kingdom
Knights of the Thistle
Lord-Lieutenants of Clackmannanshire
Members of the Privy Council of Great Britain
Members of the Privy Council of Ireland
People educated at Eton College
Scottish representative peers
Worcestershire Regiment officers
Peers of the United Kingdom created by George III
C
Military personnel from London
British expatriates in the Russian Empire